IN Televizija or IN TV was a local commercial cable television channel based in Bijeljina, Bosnia and Herzegovina. The program is mainly produced in the Bosnian language. TV station was established in 2008. IN Televizija broadcasts a variety of programs such as local news, sports, music and documentaries.

References

External links 
 www.intelevizija.com

Mass media in Bijeljina
Television stations in Bosnia and Herzegovina
Television channels and stations established in 2008
2008 establishments in Bosnia and Herzegovina